Sanchore Assembly constituency is one of constituencies of Rajasthan Legislative Assembly in the Jalore (Lok Sabha constituency).

List of members

References

See also
Member of the Legislative Assembly (India)

Jodhpur district
Assembly constituencies of Rajasthan